Trepipam (INN) is a dopamine receptor agonist of the benzazepine group that was never marketed. It acts specifically as an agonist of the dopamine D1 receptor. It is closed related structurally to fenoldopam, a peripherally acting selective D1 receptor partial agonist which is used as an antihypertensive agent.

References

1-Phenyl-2,3,4,5-tetrahydro-1H-3-benzazepines
Abandoned drugs
Benzazepines
D1-receptor agonists